Quay Street is the northernmost street in the Auckland CBD, New Zealand. The Auckland Ferry Terminal, which has ferries running to Devonport, Waiheke Island, and other places in Waitematā Harbour; the Hilton Auckland hotel; and Ports of Auckland are on the north side of the street. The Britomart Transport Centre, Queen Elizabeth Square and Grand Mercure Auckland hotel are on the south side.

Demographics

Quay Street-Customs Street had a population of 2,274 at the 2018 New Zealand census, an increase of 18 people (0.8%) since the 2013 census, and an increase of 1,170 people (106.0%) since the 2006 census. There were 1,107 households, comprising 1,206 males and 1,065 females, giving a sex ratio of 1.13 males per female. The median age was 31.9 years (compared with 37.4 years nationally), with 180 people (7.9%) aged under 15 years, 795 (35.0%) aged 15 to 29, 1,152 (50.7%) aged 30 to 64, and 141 (6.2%) aged 65 or older.

Ethnicities were 50.0% Asian, 39.2% European/, 4.4% Māori, 3.4% Pacific peoples, and 7.5% other ethnicities. People may identify with more than one ethnicity.

The percentage of people born overseas was 69.1, compared with 27.1% nationally.

Although some people chose not to answer the census's question about religious affiliation, 46.2% had no religion, 26.1% were Christian, 9.2% were Hindu, 6.5% were Muslim, 4.0% were Buddhist, 0.1% had Māori religious beliefs, and 3.4% had other religions.

Of those at least 15 years old, 924 (44.1%) people had a bachelor's or higher degree, and 93 (4.4%) people had no formal qualifications. The median income was $37,500, compared with $31,800 nationally. 510 people (24.4%) earned over $70,000 compared to 17.2% nationally. The employment status of those at least 15 was that 1,185 (56.6%) people were employed full-time, 288 (13.8%) were part-time, and 87 (4.2%) were unemployed.

History
The street was proposed in 1878 on reclaimed land and was in existence by the end of 1879. It was extended to the east to Campbell's Point (Judges Bay) in 1916.

Double railway tracks were in use down Quay Street connecting the Auckland Railway Station to the wharves until most were removed in 1985, and the final piece in 1989.

Notable locations

Harbour Historic Area, north side of Quay Street, 1904-1924, wharves and associated buildings.
Launchman's Building, Quay Street West, 1930s, now New Zealand Maritime Museum.
First World War Memorial Beacon, Princes Wharf, 1915, earliest built monument for World War I in New Zealand.
Princes Wharf, 1929, cruise ship terminal and Hilton Hotel.
Wharf Pavilions, 1915, relocated 1923, two buildings, currently a booking office for Fullers Group.
Ferry Building, 99 Quay Street, 1912, focus for Waitematā Harbour ferry traffic.
Queens Wharf, 1907-1913, significant part of Auckland's economy.
Queens Wharf Gates, north side of Quay Street on Queens Wharf, iconic red gates and fence.
Quay Street Historic Area, south side of Quay Street East, 1874-1907, industrial buildings, offices and warehouses.
Wharf Police building, 102 Quay Street, 1903, Chelsea Sugar Refining Company headquarters 1903-1960.
Union Fish Company building, 116-118 Quay Street, 1906, car importing and engineering workshop 1906-1970s.
Northern Steamship Company building, 122-124 Quay Street, 1898, Northern Steamship Company offices 1898-1974.
Auckland Harbour Board Workshops, 204 Quay Street, 1944-1989, site spread between Lower Hobson St, Customs Street and Quay Street, repair of boats, cranes and other equipment.
Port of Auckland, container and trade port on the north side of Quay Street.
Auckland City Arena, south side, 2007, sports and entertainment centre.

References

Streets in Auckland
Auckland CBD
Auckland waterfront